The 2014 Honda Indy Toronto was a Canadian open wheel motor race, held as the thirteenth and fourteenth rounds of the 2014 IndyCar Series season. It was the 28th annual edition of the Toronto Indy, and the 29th and 30th  IndyCar races to be held at the  street circuit at Exhibition Place in Toronto, Ontario, Canada. The races were contested over 65 and 56 laps respectively.

Race background
Having successfully hosted a double-header race for the first time in 2013, IndyCar again scheduled two full points races for the Toronto weekend, with race one on Saturday and race two on Sunday.

After rain on Saturday washed out race one of the weekend double bill, IndyCar officials decided to reschedule the two races on Sunday, with race one in the morning and race two in the afternoon.  The postponement created the first same-day doubleheader since the 1981 Kraco Twin 125s which were swept by Rick Mears at the Atlanta Motor Speedway.

Race 1 report
Sébastien Bourdais scored pole position for the first race of the weekend. This was Bourdais' first pole since the 2007 Bavaria Champ Car Grand Prix, at Assen. Originally scheduled to be held on Saturday afternoon, the race was held on Sunday morning; Bourdais led 58 of the race's 65 laps to take his first victory since the 2007 Gran Premio Tecate.

Round 13 Classification

Notes
 Points include 1 point for leading at least 1 lap during a race, an additional 2 points for leading the most race laps, and 1 point for Pole Position.

Race 2 report
Mike Conway driving for Ed Carpenter Racing won race 2, for his second win of the season after winning Long Beach and it marked the fourth IndyCar victory of his career.  Rain fell once again during race 2, with Penske teammates Helio Castroneves and Will Power fighting for the lead early.  Conway took advantage of a drying track and pitted on Lap 43 for dry weather tires knowing the slicks would be quicker. Conway took the lead on Lap 51, while Castroneves dropped off the pace, and holding on for the victory.

As of 2022 it was the last-ever IndyCar Series race victory for British driver to date.

Round 14 Classification 

Notes
 Points include 1 point for leading at least 1 lap during a race, an additional 2 points for leading the most race laps, and 1 point for Pole Position.

Standings after both races

Drivers' Championship

Note: Only the top five positions are included for the driver standings.

References

External links
 2014 Honda Indy Toronto Race 1 Highlights (IndyCar YouTube Channel)
 2014 Honda Indy Toronto Race 2 Highlights (IndyCar YouTube Channel)

Honda Indy Toronto
Honda Indy Toronto
Indy Toronto
Honda Indy Toronto
Honda Indy Toronto